Rivellia munda is a species of signal flies (insects in the family Platystomatidae).

References

Further reading

External links

 

munda